Casque is a French word for helmet. It can refer to:
 Casque (anatomy), an enlargement on the beaks of some species of birds, including many hornbills
Hornbill ivory, the casque of the helmeted hornbill, collected as a decorative material
 S. C. H. "Sammy" Davis (1887–1981), a motor-racing journalist who used the pen name Casque
 Casque-class destroyer, French Navy ships built between 1910 and 1912

See also
 Casque and Gauntlet, a senior society at Dartmouth College
 Cask (disambiguation)
 Kask (disambiguation)
 CASC (disambiguation)
 KASC (disambiguation)